Pokharbhinda  is a village development committee in Siraha District in the Sagarmatha Zone of south-eastern Nepal. At the time of the 1991 Nepal census it had a population of 2962 people living in 592 individual households. 97% of Population is Maithil Brahmin here. Languages spoken here are Maithili ( 94%) and Nepali (6%)

References

External links
UN map of the municipalities of  Siraha District

Populated places in Siraha District